Thitiphun Chuayprakong (born 15 July 1992) is a Thai professional golfer.

Chuayprakong has played on the Asian Tour since 2011. He picked up his first tour win at the 2016 Bashundhara Bangladesh Open. He also played in his first major that same year, the U.S. Open.

Professional wins (3)

Asian Tour wins (1)

All Thailand Golf Tour wins (1)
2013 Singha Classic

Other wins (1)
2010 Singha All Thailand Challenge

References

External links

Thitiphun Chuayprakong
Asian Tour golfers
Thitiphun Chuayprakong
1992 births
Living people
Thitiphun Chuayprakong